{{Taxobox
| color = lightgrey
| name = Desmospora activa
| domain = Bacteria
| phylum = Bacillota
| classis = Bacilli
| ordo = Bacillales
| familia = Thermoactinomycetaceae
| familia_authority = 
| genus = Desmospora
| species = D. activa
| binomial = Desmospora activa| binomial_authority = Yassin et al. 2009
| type_strain = CCUG 55916, DSM 45169, IMMIB L-1269
| subdivision = 
| synonyms = Catenispora activa
}}Desmospora activa'''''  is a Gram-positive and aerobic bacterium from the genus of Desmospora which has been isolated from the sputum from a patient with suspected pulmonary tuberculosis in Germany.

References

External links
Type strain of Desmospora activa at BacDive -  the Bacterial Diversity Metadatabase	

Bacillales
Bacteria described in 2009